The Commission may refer to:

Criminal organizations 
 Sicilian Mafia Commission, the governing body of the Mafia in Italy
 The Commission, the governing body of the Mafia in the United States

Governmental organizations 
 European Commission, the executive branch of the European Union

In music 
 The Commission (hip hop), an American hip-hop group from the mid 1990s
 The Commission (album), a 1998 album by Lil' Keke
 "The Commission" (song), a 2021 single by Cain

In television 
 The Commission, a secretive time-policing organization featured in The Umbrella Academy

See also 
 Commission (disambiguation)
 Decommission (disambiguation)